Kate Donnally is an American politician serving as a member of the Vermont House of Representatives for the Lamoille-2 district. A member of the Democratic Party, and serves with Representative Daniel Noyes. Donnally was elected in November 2020, and assumed office on January 6, 2021. She was re-elected in 2022.

Early life and education 
Born and raised in Vermont, Donnally graduated from Burlington High School in 1999. She earned a Master of Social Work from the New York University Silver School of Social Work. Donnally and her wife have two children and live in Hyde Park, Vermont.

Career 
Donnally worked at the Ali Forney Center, a community center for LGBT homeless youth in New York City. Outside of politics, she is a licensed social worker and counselor. Donnally was elected to the Vermont House of Representatives in November 2020 and assumed office on January 6, 2021.

References 

Living people
American social workers
Democratic Party members of the Vermont House of Representatives
New York University School of Social Work alumni
Women state legislators in Vermont
People from Hyde Park, Vermont
Burlington High School (Vermont) alumni
Year of birth missing (living people)